Osvaldo Ramírez Ramírez (born May 13, 1997) is an American professional soccer player.

Club career

Cancún
During the 2020–21 season, Ramírez played for Liga de Expansión MX side Cancún, making four league appearances and one in the Reclasificación.

York United
On June 2, 2021 Ramírez signed with Canadian Premier League side York United. He made his debut for York on June 27, as a substitute against Cavalry FC in a 2-1 loss. Ramirez scored his first goal for the club against Master's FA on August 21, netting the second in an eventual 5-0 victory in a Canadian Championship match. In December 2021 after the conclusion of the 2021 season, York announced they had declined his contract option.

References

External links

1997 births
Living people
Association football forwards
American soccer players
Mexican footballers
Soccer players from Wisconsin
American expatriate soccer players
Mexican expatriate footballers
Expatriate soccer players in Canada
American expatriate sportspeople in Canada
Mexican expatriate sportspeople in Canada
Ocelotes UNACH footballers
Universidad Autónoma de Zacatecas FC footballers
Cafetaleros de Chiapas footballers
York United FC players
Liga Premier de México players
Ascenso MX players
Canadian Premier League players
People from De Pere, Wisconsin